Cynthia Lockhart  (born 1952, Cincinnati, Ohio) is an artist known for textile art. Lockhart taught at the University of Cincinnati's Design, Art, Architecture, and Planning (DAAP) for twenty five years, retiring as professor emerita. In 2019 she had a solo exhibition entitled Journey to Freedom: Art Quilts by Cynthia Lockhart at the Taft Museum of Art.

Her work, Created To Be Me, was acquired by the Smithsonian American Art Museum as part of the Renwick Gallery's 50th Anniversary Campaign.

References

1952 births
Living people
Artists from Cincinnati
20th-century American women artists
University of Cincinnati faculty
American textile artists
20th-century women textile artists
20th-century textile artists
21st-century American women artists
21st-century women textile artists
21st-century textile artists